The 1942 Green Bay Packers season was their 24th season overall and their 22nd season in the National Football League. The team finished with an 8–2–1 record under coach Curly Lambeau, earning a second-place finish in the Western Conference.

Offseason

NFL draft

Regular season

Schedule

Standings

Roster

Awards and records
Don Hutson, NFL receiving leader, 58 receptions
Cecil Isbell, NFL leader, passing yards (2,021)

Milestones

References
Sportsencyclopedia.com

Green Bay Packers seasons
Green Bay Packers
Green